Version 1 is an Irish company specializing in international management consulting, software asset management, software development, cloud computing, and outsourcing company.

On July 13, 2022, Partners Group completed the acquisition of a majority stake in Version 1.

History
Version 1 was established in Dublin, Ireland in 1996 by Justin Keatinge and John Mullen.

In the years leading up to 2011, Version 1 was named in the Deloitte Fast 50 list and employed more than 150 consultants and had annual revenues of €17.5m.

In 2014, Version 1 opened its London, UK, office and expanded its Belfast, Northern Ireland, office. Version 1 acquired the UK-based Tieto Corporation, and were recognized as one of the top 50 workplaces in Europe. They went on to acquire UK-based Rocela Group along with the UK-based Patech Solutions. By year end, they had a total of eight international offices employing more than 500 consultants with annual revenues of €60m.

In 2017, the UK equity firm Volpi Capital LLP became the majority shareholder in Version 1 in a deal that saw a €100 million buy out of the original founders and shareholders. Shareholders included the Development Capital Fund, who invested c. €8m in 2014 and realized in excess of c. €20m on their investment. This buy out raised €90 million of expansion capital to allow Version 1 expand its operations in the UK and Europe. On 24 April 2017, Tom O'Connor was appointed as Version 1 CEO after former CEO Justin Keatinge resigned. Keatinge stayed on Version 1's board and remains a major shareholder.

In 2018, Version 1 announced a €1 million investment into its Innovation Labs. The current areas of focus are: Blockchain, Internet of things, Chatbots, Machine learning, Virtual reality and Augmented reality. 
In June 2018 Version 1 acquired the HR Transformation specialist Cedar Consulting Ltd.

In 2019, Version 1 presented alongside ICBF at Oracle OpenWorld, where a Blockchain Solution for the trace-ability of Irish Cattle and meat was discussed. Version 1 also presented at Microsoft Future Decoded 2019, Microsoft's main UK event, with Roger Whitehead, Advisory Services Lead at Version 1 discussing the impact of Application Modernisation.

In 2022, Version 1 are nominated for "Employee of the Year" in the Women in IT Awards 2023.

Partners 
Version 1 has multiple long standing and enhanced partner relationships. The company currently has three main technology partners: Oracle Corporation, Microsoft and Amazon Web Services. Version 1 has been a Platinum Partner for Oracle in Cloud Managed Services and has the Largest Oracle capability in the UK and Ireland. Version 1 was also voted as the No. 1 Oracle Partner by their customers, in both the 2018 and 2018 Oracle User Group Awards.

Version 1 is a Microsoft Solutions Partner and has worked with Microsoft since 2006, being named Microsoft Partner of the Year in 2011, Application Development Partner of the Year for Ireland in 2015, and Business Intelligence and Data Analytics Partner of the Year in 2016. In 2019, Version 1 were awarded Microsoft's 2019 Partner Award for Intelligent Cloud  Data Estate Modernization.

Version 1 was one of the first Amazon Web Services Partners in Europe and is a Premier Consulting Partner across areas such as Migration, Public Sector and Managed Services Provider.

OneZeroOne Podcast 
In April, 2019, Version 1 launched their own podcast, OneZeroOne. The OneZeroOne podcast is a series of conversations with technology and innovation experts across the UK and Ireland, who will share their ideas, experiences and lessons with listeners. The podcast is available on Spotify, AudioBoom, Deezer and other streaming services, with six episodes released as of September 2019. Speakers include John Beckett, CEO and co-founder of ChannelSight, and William Conaghan and Lizzy Hayashida, founders of Change Donations.

Community Trust
In 2014, Version 1 initiated a Community Trust program supporting local and global charitable and sports organizations. Grants are awarded on a quarterly basis, ranging in value from €500 to €5,000. A public vote determines which causes receive the grants available, with voting undertaken on the company's Facebook page. One 2015 winner was DEBRA Ireland, which won a grant of €3,500.

Version 1 sponsored the 2017 Leinster Loop, that took place in the Republic of Ireland on 13 August. Leinster Loop has been nominated multiple times as Cycling Ireland's Best Cycle Event, and this challenging cycle consisted of five routes spread out over 130 kilometres. All funds raised for this event went towards Breast Cancer Research and St. Laurence's GAA Community Complex. Version 1 employees across the UK supported the 2019 Byte Night, the UK's largest corporate sleep out event, to fund-raise and support homelessness children.

References

2022 mergers and acquisitions
Consulting firms established in 1996
Information technology consulting firms of Ireland
International information technology consulting firms
International management consulting firms
Irish companies established in 1996